William Ellsworth Blair (September 17, 1863 – February 22, 1890) was a Major League Baseball player. A left-handed pitcher who batted from the left side, Blair had a listed playing weight of 172 pounds.

In an eight-year career as a professional, Blair spent one season in the major leagues. He started four games for the Philadelphia Athletics of the American Association in 1888, winning one and losing three. His 2.61 ERA was better than the league average, and he was also a positive contributor with the bat, posting a .308 batting average, .357 on-base percentage, and .385 slugging percentage in 14 plate appearances.

Blair had signed a contract to spend the 1890 season with the Chicago Cubs, but he died as a result of illness before games began, during the first outbreak of the 1889–1890 pandemic. His obituary listed the cause of death as "influenza, which turned into pneumonia and typhoid fever".

See also
 List of baseball players who died during their careers

References

External links

1863 births
1890 deaths
Major League Baseball pitchers
Philadelphia Athletics (AA) players
Baseball players from Pittsburgh
Deaths from the 1889–1890 flu pandemic
Infectious disease deaths in Pennsylvania
19th-century baseball players
Pittsburgh Liberty Stars players
East Liberty Liberty Stars players
Zanesville Kickapoos players
Mansfield (minor league baseball) players
Hamilton Hams players
Burials at Homewood Cemetery
Deaths from pneumonia in Pennsylvania
Deaths from typhoid fever